Michel Dupuy,  (born January 11, 1930) is a Canadian diplomat,   journalist, academic and politician. Born in Paris, France, his father was Pierre Dupuy who was also a Canadian diplomat.

Dupuy was a long time diplomat in the Department of External Affairs. He served as Ambassador to the United Nations from 1980 to 1981, and Ambassador to France from 1981 to 1985.

He subsequently entered politics and was defeated in his attempt to win a seat in the House of Commons of Canada in the 1988 election. He was elected on his second attempt in the 1993 election as the Liberal Member of Parliament for Laval West. He immediately joined the Cabinet, serving concurrently as Minister of Communications and Minister of Multiculturalism and Citizenship from 1993 until January 1996. During his tenure, the departments he oversaw were merged into the new Department of Canadian Heritage

Dupuy came under fire for "representing a constituency in a Canadian Radio-television and Telecommunications Commission (CRTC) application" because he was the minister responsible for the agency, and was subsequently dropped from Cabinet.

He did not run in the 1997 election.

Electoral record

References

External links

1930 births
Living people
French Quebecers
Ambassadors of Canada to France
Permanent Representatives of Canada to the United Nations
Liberal Party of Canada MPs
Members of the 26th Canadian Ministry
Members of the House of Commons of Canada from Quebec
Members of the King's Privy Council for Canada